Tushar Kanti Chakraborty (born 1957) is an Indian organic chemist and a professor at the Indian Institute of Science. He has served as a director of Central Drug Research Institute and as a chief scientist at the Indian Institute of Chemical Technology. He is known for the discovery of novel macrocyclic systems and is an elected fellow of the Indian National Science Academy National Academy of Sciences, India and the Indian Academy of Sciences The Council of Scientific and Industrial Research, the apex agency of the Government of India for scientific research, awarded him the Shanti Swarup Bhatnagar Prize for Science and Technology, one of the highest Indian science awards, in 2002, for his contributions to chemical sciences.

Biography 

T. K. Chakraborty, born on 10 April 1957 in the Indian state of West Bengal, completed his graduate studies (BSc hons) in 1977 at Presidency College, (then under Calcutta University) and joined the Indian Institute of Technology, Kanpur where he did his master's course in 1979. He continued at IIT Kanpur for his doctoral studies under the guidance of Srinivasan Chandrasekaran, a Shanti Swarup Bhatnagar laureate, and secured a PhD in 1984 before moving to University of Pennsylvania where he did his post-doctoral studies at the laboratory of K. C. Nicolaou. He returned to India in 1987 and started his career as a C-grade scientist at the Indian Institute of Chemical Technology. He served IICT for more than two decades except for two breaks; the first for 6 months in 1989 as an exchange visitor at Shemyakin-Ovchinnikov Institute of Bioorganic Chemistry, Modcow and the second, for 2 years from 1992 to 1994 at Scripps Research Institute as a visiting scientist. At IICT, he rose from C-grade scientist to G-grade chief scientist by 2008 when he was appointed as the director of Central Drug Research Institute to superannuate from service in 2013. Post-retirement, he serves as a professor at the Indian Institute of Science since 2014.

Legacy 
Chakraborty's researches covered the design and synthesis of unnatural amino acids, cyclic peptides and biologically active natural products. He is credited with designing new amide-linked molecular entities based on Sugar Amino Acids and anticancer compounds such as amphidinolides, epothilones, crocacins, and clavosolide and the synthesis of glycopeptide antibiotics (vancomycin and teicoplanin) and immunosuppressants (FK506, rapamycin, stevastelins and antascomicin). He has published his researches by way of several peer-reviewed articles; ResearchGate, an online repository of the science articles, has listed 243 of them. He has also mentored several doctoral scholars in their studies.

Awards and honors 
Chakraborty received two awards in 1991, the Young Scientist Awards of Andhra Pradesh Akademi of Sciences and the Council of Scientific and Industrial Research (CSIR). CSIR honored him again 2002 with the Shanti Swarup Bhatnagar Prize, one of the highest Indian science awards. In between, he received Dr. Basudev Banerjee Memorial Award of the Indian Chemical Society in 1999. The year 2002 brought him one more award, the Bronze Medal of the Chemical Research Society of India. He received Andhra Pradesh Scientist Award and the Innocentive Champion Medal in 2005. The NASI-Reliance Industries Platinum Jubilee Award reached him in 2006 and three years later, he received the Jawaharlal Nehru National Award in Science of Madhya Pradesh Council of Science and Technology. Holder of J. C. Bose National Fellowship in 2008, he was elected by the National Academy of Sciences, India as their fellow in 2000 and he became an elected fellow of the Indian Academy of Sciences in 2003 and the Indian National Science Academy in 2007.

See also 

 Peptides 
 Peptidomimetics
 Srinivasan Chandrasekaran
 K. C. Nicolaou

References

External links 
 

Recipients of the Shanti Swarup Bhatnagar Award in Chemical Science
1957 births
Indian scientific authors
Fellows of the Indian Academy of Sciences
Fellows of the Indian National Science Academy
Living people
Scientists from West Bengal
Indian organic chemists
University of Calcutta alumni
IIT Kanpur alumni
University of Pennsylvania alumni
Scripps Research faculty
Academic staff of the Indian Institute of Science
Presidency University, Kolkata alumni